Vyacheslav Hryhorovych Pidnebennoy (born 3 May 1988) is a Ukrainian professional footballer who plays as a central midfielder for Spanish club Palencia.

References

External links
 
 

1988 births
Living people
Sportspeople from Mariupol
Ukrainian footballers
Association football midfielders
FC Shakhtar-2 Donetsk players
FC Shakhtar-3 Donetsk players
FC Stal Alchevsk players
FC Olimpik Donetsk players
FC Kramatorsk players
FC Poltava players
MFC Mykolaiv players
PFC Sumy players
FC Dacia Chișinău players
FC Naftovyk-Ukrnafta Okhtyrka players
FC Inhulets Petrove players
FC Alians Lypova Dolyna players
Palencia CF players
Ukrainian First League players
Ukrainian Second League players
Moldovan Super Liga players
Ukrainian expatriate footballers
Expatriate footballers in Moldova
Ukrainian expatriate sportspeople in Moldova
Expatriate footballers in Spain
Ukrainian expatriate sportspeople in Spain